Philip "Fyvush" Finkel (October 9, 1922 – August 14, 2016) was an American actor known as a star of Yiddish theater and for his role as lawyer Douglas Wambaugh on the television series Picket Fences, for which he earned an Emmy Award for Outstanding Supporting Actor in a Drama Series in 1994. He is also known for his portrayal of Harvey Lipschultz, a crotchety history teacher, on the television series Boston Public.

Early life
Philip Finkel was born at home in Brownsville, Brooklyn, the third of four sons of Jewish immigrant parents, Mary ("Miryam"), a housewife from Minsk, Belarus, and Harry ("Cwi Hirsh") Finkel, a tailor from Warsaw. He adopted the stage name "Fyvush", a common Yiddish given name.

Career
Finkel first appeared on the stage at age 9, and acted for almost 35 years in the thriving Yiddish theaters of the Yiddish Theater District of Manhattan's Lower East Side, as well as performing as a standup comic in the Catskills' Borscht Belt. In 2008, he recalled:

I played child parts till I was 14, 15, then my voice changed. So I decided to learn a trade and went to a vocational high school in New York. I studied to be a furrier, but I never worked at it. As soon as I graduated high school, I went to a stock company in Pittsburgh, a Jewish theater, and I played there for 38 weeks, and that's where I actually learned my trade a little bit as an adult.

He worked regularly until the ethnic venues began dying out in the early 1960s, then made his Broadway theatre debut in the original 1964 production of the musical Fiddler on the Roof, joining the cast as Mordcha, the innkeeper, in 1965. The production ran through July 2, 1972. Finkel then played Lazar Wolf, the butcher, in the limited run 1981 Broadway revival, and eventually played the lead role of Tevye the milkman for years in the national touring company.

Shortly afterward, Finkel succeeded Hy Anzell in the role of Mr. Mushnik in the Off-Broadway musical Little Shop of Horrors. Then in 1988, Finkel's work as "Sam" in the New York Shakespeare Festival revival of the Yiddish classic Cafe Crown earned him an Obie Award and a Drama Desk nomination.

Finkel made his movie debut in the English-subtitled, Yiddish sketch-comedy revue Monticello, Here We Come (1950), then after small parts in an episode of the television series Kojak in 1977 and the miniseries Evergreen in 1985, returned to film in the detective comedy Off Beat (1986). That same year saw a role opposite Robin Williams in a PBS American Playhouse adaptation of Saul Bellow's novel Seize the Day, and a role in the film adaptation of Neil Simon's Broadway comedy Brighton Beach Memoirs. An appearance as a lawyer in director Sidney Lumet's Q & A (1990) led TV producer-writer David E. Kelley to cast Finkel as public defender Douglas Wambaugh in the television series Picket Fences (CBS, 1992–1996). For the role, Finkel earned a 1994 Emmy Award, announcing at the televised ceremonies that he had waited 51 years for that moment.

Following the end of Picket Fences, Finkel had a regular role on the short-lived revival of Fantasy Island (ABC, 1998) and then reteamed with writer-producer Kelley to play history teacher Harvey Lipschultz in Boston Public (Fox; 2000–04).

Through the 1990s and 2000s, Finkel appeared in movies including Nixon and The Crew, guested on TV series including Chicago Hope, Law & Order, Early Edition, and Hollywood Squares, and provided voiceovers for episodes of the animated series The Simpsons ("Lisa's Sax") and Aaahh!!! Real Monsters ("Ickis! You'll Be Snorched!") and the animated direct-to-video feature The Brave Little Toaster Goes to Mars. In 2009, he appeared in the Coen brothers' film A Serious Man, and in 2013 had a guest appearance in Blue Bloods ("Men In Black")

Finkel continued to appear onstage in productions such as Fyvush Finkel: From Second Avenue to Broadway (1997) and Classic Stage Company's historical drama New Jerusalem (2007), by playwright David Ives.

Personal life
Finkel was married to Trudi Lieberman from March 1947 until her death in 2009. They had two sons: Ian, a musical arranger and xylophonist, and Elliot, a concert pianist.

Finkel died in Manhattan on August 14, 2016, at the age of 93, as a result of heart problems. His son Ian died on November 16, 2020, from COVID-19.

Awards
American Comedy Award for his performance in Picket Fences (1993) 
Emmy Award for Best Supporting Actor in a Dramatic Series, Picket Fences (1993–94)
Obie Award for his performance in Cafe Crown (1988–89)

Filmography

Film

Television

References

External links

Profile: Fyvush Finkel, Aveleyman.com; accessed September 22, 2016.

1922 births
2016 deaths
Yiddish theatre performers
American people of Polish-Jewish descent
American people of Belarusian-Jewish descent
American male film actors
American male television actors
American male stage actors
Jewish American male actors
Male actors from New York City
Outstanding Performance by a Supporting Actor in a Drama Series Primetime Emmy Award winners
Vaudeville performers
Obie Award recipients
People from Brownsville, Brooklyn
American male voice actors
21st-century American Jews